Add Fuel is Portuguese visual artist and illustrator Diogo Machado (born 1980). With a degree in Graphic Design from Lisbon's IADE – Institute of Visual Arts, Design and Marketing, he spent a few years working in design studios in Portugal, followed by an eight-month stint in Munich, Germany. Since 2007, he has been focusing exclusively on his artistic work. Starting out under the full name Add Fuel to the Fire, he first created a dark yet exuberant visual universe populated by a cast of slimy, eccentric and joyful creatures, influenced by a variety of interests ranging from video games to comics, animation, sci-fi, low-budget B films, designer toys, and urban visual culture.

In 2008, fascinated with the aesthetic possibilities of symmetrical patterning and tessellations, he shortened his moniker and began redirecting his focus towards working with and reinterpreting the language of traditional tile design, and that of the Portuguese tin-glazed ceramic azulejo in particular. Effortlessly blending these two seemingly-irreconcilable visual idioms, his current practice seeks to combine traditional decorative elements with contemporary visual referents into new forms that reveal an impressive complexity and a masterful attention to detail. If, on the face of it, his work in small- and medium-sized tile panels, large-scale stencil-painted murals, and print editions might seem simply a pastiche of classic formalism, a closer inspection rewards the viewer with a chaotic world of unequivocally original motifs and characters brimming with irony and humour. Creating balance and harmony from symmetrical repetitions, a build-up of layers and techniques of visual illusion such as trompe-l'œil, his multi-layered patterned compositions produce a poetic rhythm that plays with the viewer's perception and the (multiple) possibilities of interpretation. Exploring a wide range of both manual and digital techniques in the fields of drawing, painting, ceramics, and printing, his practice expresses a sophisticated dialogue between the old and the new, between heritage and modernity.

Besides the numerous public art interventions he has been creating in various countries, he has also been showcasing his work in solo and group exhibitions in reputed galleries, including Underdogs Gallery (Lisbon, 2017 and 2014), Saatchi Gallery (London, 2017), Nuart Gallery (Stavanger, 2017), ABV Gallery (Atlanta, 2017), Colab Gallery (Weil am Rhein, 2015), Galerie SOON (Zurich, 2013), and Pure Evil Gallery (London, 2012), and leading urban art events such as Nuart Festival (Aberdeen, 2017; Stavanger, 2016), PUBLIC’16 (Perth and Albany, 2016), Sacramento Mural Fest (Sacramento, 2016), Forgotten Project (Rome, 2015), Djerbahood (Djerba, 2014), and Tour Paris 13 (Paris, 2013), among many others.

Diogo Machado lives and works in Cascais, Portugal.

Artistic style 

Diogo Machado's artwork combines fictional characters, decorative elements, and humor. His mural work using tiles and stencils is inspired by trompe-l'œil, and often emphasizes symmetry.

Career

Illustration 

Add Fuel has cited an older cousin who introduced him to a wide range of popular and classical artforms as a childhood influence.

Street Art, Ceramic panels and Murals 

Add Fuel has used azulejo mosaic tiles as a medium for graffiti and other works, and has also described is as a cultural influence.

Machado traces his initial interest in reviving azulejo to the Cascais ArtSpace festival in Cascais in 2008. "At the time, I received the invitation to cover an entire building with a giant printed canvas and my idea was to develop an illustration piece that would represent me as an inhabitant of my city, being the festival in Cascais." he says. "I investigated several portuguese traditional techniques and elements, such as the Galo de Barcelos and the Arraiolos tapestries, but it was a building, so the azulejo aesthetic was the one it felt right to work on"

After this first experience, Machado studied azulejo and ceramics and began applying it to other urban art settings, often in incongruous and non-traditional contexts. Noteworthy pieces include a 30 meters long ceramic mural, made for the Walk & Talk Public Art Festival on Ponta Delgada in the Azores islands.

Add Fuel has also used stencil techniques, partly as a response to the cost and logistical challenges of tile murals.

Explaining why he chose the name Add Fuel, Machado has said "it's an abbreviation of the expression 'add fuel to the fire' which I like and used as my name for some time. The fact that it's in English is just because it's easier to work in an international market. Diogo Machado is hard to pronounce and to work just in the Portuguese market, unfortunately is not possible."

Exhibitions 

2014. Concentricum (Mercearia de Arte Alves & Silvestre, Coimbra, Portugal)
2013. International Colors (SOON Gallery, Bern, Switzerland)
2013. Tour Paris 13 (Paris, France)
2012. Urb4n Art LX (Influx Contemporary Art Gallery, Lisbon, Portugal)
2012. Cascais ArtSpace (Cascais, Portugal)
2012. Spaces Within (Pure Evil Gallery, London, United Kingdom) 
2011. 'Planet Fire' app release (Montana Shop & Gallery, Lisbon, Portugal)
2009. 'Le Coq Tuguese (Experimenta Design, Lisbon, Portugal)
2008. Cascais ArtSpace (Cascais, Portugal)
2007. Red Bull Street Gallery (Lisbon, Portugal)

Others 

2014. Djerbahood, Tunisia
2014. Fenêtre Sur le Portugal (Paris, France)
2013. Le M.U.R. (Mulhouse, France)
2013. ArturB Residency (Lagos, Portugal)
2013. Fusing Cultural Experience (Figueira da Foz, Portugal)
2013. WOOL on Tour - Tem Sempre Encanto (Coimbra, Portugal)
2013. Muro Azul - CHPL (Lisbon, Portugal)
2012. WOOL on Tour - Lx Factory (Alcântara (Lisbon), Portugal)
2012. Walk & Talk Public Art Festival (Ponta Delgada, Azores)
2012. GAU - Lowbrow (Lisbon, Portugal)
2010. Secret Wars - Lisbon Team (Lisboa & Berlin)
2009. MTV From Grey to Rainbow (Barreiro (city), Portugal)
2008. Fuel TV - Portugal Launch - Lx Factory (Alcântara (Lisbon), Portugal)

Commissioned projects 
A Better Tomorrow, Alfa Romeo, Avalon7, Beatbombers, Burton Snowboards, Cropp, Colourlovers, Computer Arts, Dj Ride, Don't Panic, Digit, Europa Magazine, Feed The Beast FUEL TV, GAU Lisbon, MTV, MySpace, Nike, Inc., Popular Mechanics, Pyknic Clothing, Pocket Frenz, Red Bull, Toy2R, TMN (Meo (mobile phone company)), Wired (magazine), X-Funs, Yes No Maybe.

Media

Press 
Jornal O Público (2014): "Azulejo tradicional de Add Fuel em Coimbra"
Jornal i Online (2014): "Devolver os azulejos ás paredes"
Neo Pop Tv (2013): "NEW POP CULTURE: Diogo Machado Ep.2"
Neo Pop Tv (2013): "NEW POP CULTURE: Diogo Machado Ep.1"
IdN (International designers' Network) (2013): "Creative Country: Portugal"
Street Art News (2013): "The Rise of Portuguese "Arte Urbana"
Lux WOMAN (2013): "Mental Idade de Diogo Machado e Eime"
Choco la Design (2013): "Os azulejos de Add Fuel"
INFLUX Contemporary Art Gallery Featured Artist (2013)
Jornal O Público (2013): "Artistas portugueses “ocupam” prédio abandonado em Paris"
Jornal O Público (2012): "Walk&Talk, um abecedário de arte pública"
Le blog de la galerie d'art Limitedartgallery.com (2012): "Arty Friday #4 – Diogo Machado aka ADD FUEL TO THE FIRE"
Jornal O Público (2012): "O azulejo tradicional reinventado por artistas contemporâneos"
Science of the Time (2011): "Portuguese Mosaic Tiles Meet Urban Graffiti"
Arize Magazine (2008): "Diogo Machado–Well known illustrator Diogo…Adds Fuel to the Fire"
Falar Criativo podcast (2015) :Interview of Add Fuel

References

External links 
 

Living people
1980 births
Portuguese artists
Portuguese graffiti artists
Street artists
People from Cascais
Date of birth missing (living people)
Articles containing video clips